Malpighia obtusifolia is a species of plant in the family Malpighiaceae. It is endemic to Jamaica.

References

obtusifolia
Vulnerable plants
Endemic flora of Jamaica
Taxonomy articles created by Polbot